Jessica Zahedi (born 1 August 1978 in Heidelberg) is a German television presenter and journalist.

Zahedi completed her Abitur at the Gutenberg-Gymnasium in Mainz and studied political science at the University of Hagen. Later she worked at Radio RPR, where she was a trainee. After collaborating on an online TV project of 1. FC Kaiserslautern and as a reporter, she participated in the launch of the youth wave bigFM in Rheinland-Pfalz. Finally, she went to Hamburg to work at Scholz & Friends in advertising. Then she returned to Mainz. Since 2006 she has worked at ZDF in the Today program.
Zahedi has a child born in 2012.

Programs 
Currently
 heute Xpress (since 2015)
Formerly
 heute plus (2011–2015)
 heute (Early and late editions, short segments during the ZDF morning magazine; 2011-2015)

References

External links 
 Jessica Zahedis Twitter Stream

German television journalists
German television presenters
German women television presenters
German women television journalists
1978 births
German broadcast news analysts
Mass media people from Heidelberg
Living people
ZDF people
ZDF heute presenters and reporters